Remixes, released in 2001, is a compilation album by Luis Fonsi featuring remixes of songs from his first two albums, Comenzaré and Eterno.

Track listing
 "Mi Sueño (Radio Edit)" – 3:36
 "Mi Sueño (Club Mix)" – 9:20
 "No Te Cambio Por Ninguna (Radio Edit)" – 3:25
 "No Te Cambio Por Ninguna (Club Mix)" – 7:28
 "No Te Cambio Por Ninguna (Dance Mix)" – 8:54
 "Imaginame Sin Ti (Remix)" – 4:07
 "Me Iré (Remix)" – 5:01
 "Me Iré (Club Mix)" – 3:38
 "No Te Cambio Por Ninguna (Radio Edit-Instrumental)" – 3:25
 "Mi Sueño (Radio Edit-Instrumental)" - 3:36

References

Luis Fonsi remix albums
2001 remix albums
Universal Music Latino remix albums
Spanish-language remix albums